Róisín Heneghan is an Irish architect and designer. She is co-founder of Heneghan Peng Architects along with Shi-Fu Peng. The company was established in New York in 1999 but was shifted to Dublin in 2001. In 2014, she was shortlisted for Architects' Journal Woman Architect of the Year.

Education 
Róisín Heneghan received a Bachelor of Architecture (1987) from the University College of Dublin and holds a Master of Architecture from Harvard University.

Projects 
The Palestinian Museum, Palestine, Under Construction, May 2016
Airbnb's European Operations Hub, Dublin, 2014
 Irish Pavilion, Venice Bienalle, 2011
 Giant's Causeway Visitor Centre
 Grand Egyptian Museum, Cairo

Awards
American Institute of Architects Award, 2001
"Young Architects Forum" Architectural League of New York, 1999
Boston Society of Architects Unbuilt Project Awards, 1998
UCD Alumni Award English & Architecture 2020

References 

Living people
Alumni of University College Dublin
Harvard Graduate School of Design alumni
Irish women architects
Year of birth missing (living people)